South Cambridgeshire is a local government district of Cambridgeshire, England, with a population of 162,119 at the 2021 census. It was formed on 1 April 1974 by the merger of Chesterton Rural District and South Cambridgeshire Rural District. It completely surrounds the city of Cambridge, which is administered separately from the district by Cambridge City Council.

Southern Cambridgeshire, including both the district of South Cambridgeshire and the city of Cambridge, has a population of over 281,000 (including students) and an area of 1,017.28 km square.

On the abolition of South Herefordshire and Hereford districts to form the unitary Herefordshire in 1998, South Cambridgeshire became the only English district to completely encircle another.

The district's coat of arms contains a tangential reference to the coat of arms of the University of Cambridge
by way of the coat of arms of Cambridge suburb Chesterton.
The motto, means "Nothing Without Work" (or effort) in pre-standard Dutch; the only Dutch motto in British civic heraldry.  It was originally the motto of Cornelius Vermuyden, who drained the Fens in the 17th century. The district council's headquarters moved from Cambridge to Cambourne in 2004.

South Cambridgeshire has scored highly on the best places to live, according to Channel 4, which ranked South Cambridgeshire as the fifth-best place to live in 2006. A Halifax survey rated South Cambridgeshire the best place to live in rural Britain, and sixth best overall in 2017.

In 2010 South Cambridgeshire had the highest median household income in the county of Cambridgeshire.

List of settlements
Abington Piggotts – Arrington – Babraham – Balsham – Bar Hill – Barrington – Bartlow – Barton – Bassingbourn cum Kneesworth – Bourn – Boxworth – Caldecote – Cambourne – Carlton – Castle Camps – Caxton – Childerley – Chishills – Chittering – Comberton – Conington – Coton – Cottenham – Croxton – Croydon – Dry Drayton – Duxford – Elsworth – Eltisley – Fen Ditton – Fen Drayton – Fowlmere – Foxton – Fulbourn – Gamlingay – Girton – Grantchester – Graveley – Great Abington – Great Eversden – Great Shelford – Great Wilbraham – Guilden Morden – Hardwick – Harlton – Harston – Haslingfield – Hatley – Hauxton – Heydon – Hildersham – Hinxton – Histon – Horseheath – Horningsea – Ickleton – Impington – Kingston – Knapwell – Landbeach – Linton – Litlington – Little Abington – Little Eversden – Little Gransden – Little Shelford – Little Wilbraham – Lolworth – Longstanton – Longstowe – Madingley – Melbourn – Meldreth – Milton – Newton – Oakington – Orchard Park – Orwell – Over – Pampisford – Papworth Everard – Papworth St Agnes – Rampton – Sawston – Shepreth – Shingay cum Wendy – Shudy Camps – Six Mile Bottom – Stapleford – Steeple Morden – Stow-cum-Quy – Swavesey – Tadlow – Teversham – Thriplow & Heathfield – Toft – Waterbeach – West Wickham – West Wratting – Weston Colville – Westwick – Whaddon – Whittlesford – Willingham – Wimpole

Local government

South Cambridgeshire District Council's headquarters are located in South Cambridgeshire Hall in the Cambourne Business Park in Cambourne. The council consists of 45 councillors (reduced from 57 in 2018), representing 26 electoral wards (reduced from 34 in 2018). Since 2018 the council has been run by the Liberal Democrats. Before this, from 2007, the Conservatives had control, and prior to that, no party had overall control of the council.

Composition

The council consists of 45 councillors, representing 26 electoral wards. The Liberal Democrats currently have a majority on the council, having gained control in the 2018 local elections. Prior to this, the Conservative party had overall control of the council since 2007, although independents formed the majority of the council from its formation in 1973 until 1992.  Councillors are elected to four year terms. The 2018 elections were the first of the All-out Elections under the new policy agreed in 2015; previous to that, elections for a third of all councillors took place in three years out of a four-year cycle, with one year without an election.

Cabinet

Councillors and Wards

Transportation
Cambridge Airport is located in South Cambridgeshire.

The Cambridgeshire Guided Busway passes through South Cambridgeshire.

Economy
ScotAirways has its head office on the grounds of Cambridge Airport in South Cambridgeshire.

References

External links

 South Cambridgeshire
 List of settlements on South Cambridgeshire website
 Coat of arms

 
Non-metropolitan districts of Cambridgeshire